Petr is a Czech given name for males and a Czech surname. Petr is the Czech form of Peter. For information on Petr as a first name, see Peter (given name).

Given name 
 Petr Aven (born 1955), Russian billionaire banker, economist and politician
 Petr Čech (born 1982), Czech footballer
 Petr Čech (hurdler) (born 1944), Czech hurdler
 Petr Chelčický (c. 1390 – c. 1460), Czech Christian spiritual leader and author in Bohemia
 Petr Cornelie (born 1996), French basketball player
 Petr Duchoň (born 1956), Czech politician
 Petr Fiala (born 1964), Czech politician and Prime Minister of the Czech Republic
 Petr Ginz (1928–1944), Czechoslovak half-Jewish writer, diarist and publisher, victim of the Holocaust
 Petr Kellner (1964–2021), Czech billionaire businessman
 Petr Korda (born 1968), Czech tennis player
 Petr Mitrichev (born 1985), Russian competitive programmer under the handle "Petr"
 Petr Mrázek (born 1992), Czech ice hockey goaltender
 Petr Nedvěd (born 1971), Czech ice hockey player
 Petr Pavel (born 1961), president-elect of Czech Republic, former army general
 Pětr Šołtka (1945–2022), German-Sorb politician
 Petr Yan (born 1993), UFC Bantamweight Champion

Surname
 Jacqueline Petr (born 1970), Canadian ice dancer
 Jakub Petr (born 1990), Czech footballer
 Jiří Petr (1931–2014), Czech agroscientist and Rector Emeritus of the CULS Prague
 Radek Petr (born 1987), Czech footballer

See also 
 
 Petru
 Pieter
 Petro (disambiguation)
 Petre

Czech masculine given names
Czech-language surnames